Pseudolaguvia is a genus of South Asian river catfishes. These species inhabit hill streams and large rivers. P. tenebricosa is found in fast running, clear water; the river has a sandy bottom and numerous rocks and boulders and aquatic vegetation is absent. P. inornata is from clear, shallow, moderately flowing streams with a predominantly sandy bottom. P. muricata is found in clear, shallow, slow-flowing streams with a mixed substrate of sand and detritus; these fish are found amongst detritus in areas with current. P. ferula is also found in swift flowing waters with a mixed rocky/sandy bottom.

Species
There are currently 22 recognized species in this genus:
 Pseudolaguvia assula H. H. Ng & Conway, 2013 
 Pseudolaguvia austrina Radhakrishnan, Sureshkumar & H. H. Ng, 2011
 Pseudolaguvia ferruginea H. H. Ng, 2009
 Pseudolaguvia ferula H. H. Ng, 2006
 Pseudolaguvia flavida H. H. Ng, 2009
 Pseudolaguvia foveolata H. H. Ng, 2005
 Pseudolaguvia fucosa H. H. Ng, Lalramliana & Lalronunga, 2016 
 Pseudolaguvia inornata H. H. Ng, 2005
 Pseudolaguvia jiyaensis Tamang & Sinha, 2014 
 Pseudolaguvia kapuri (Tilak & Husain, 1975)
 Pseudolaguvia lapillicola Britz, A. Ali & Raghavan, 2013 
 Pseudolaguvia magna Tamang & Sinha, 2014 
 Pseudolaguvia muricata H. H. Ng, 2005
 Pseudolaguvia nepalensis 
 Pseudolaguvia nubila H. H. Ng, Lalramliana, Lalronunga & Lalnuntluanga, 2013 
 Pseudolaguvia ribeiroi (Hora, 1921) (Painted catfish)
 Pseudolaguvia shawi (Hora, 1921)
 Pseudolaguvia spicula H. H. Ng & Lalramliana, 2010
 Pseudolaguvia tenebricosa Britz & Ferraris, 2003
 Pseudolaguvia tuberculata (Prashad & Mukerji, 1929)
 Pseudolaguvia virgulata H. H. Ng & Lalramliana, 2010
 Pseudolaguvia viriosa H. H. Ng & Tamang, 2012

Description
Externally, these fish resemble members of the sisorid catfish genus Glyptothorax. Pseudolaguvia is diagnosed by the presence of a short thoracic adhesive apparatus with median depression; wide gill openings nearly meeting one another on the underside of the body; serrations on anterior margin of pectoral fin spine pointing toward tip; smooth to granulate anterior margin on the dorsal fin spine; slender body; papillate upper lip; and 8–10 anal fin rays. Both the dorsal fin and pectoral fin have strong spines. The head and body are slightly depressed. The eyes are small, dorsal, and located in the middle of the head. The barbels are annulated with black rings.

References

Erethistidae
Fish of South Asia
Taxa named by Kamla Sankar Misra
Freshwater fish genera
Catfish genera